Wardlow is a hamlet in southern Alberta, Canada within Special Area No. 2.

Demographics 
Wardlow recorded a population of 28 in the 1991 Census of Population conducted by Statistics Canada.

See also 
List of communities in Alberta
List of hamlets in Alberta

References 

Hamlets in Alberta
Special Area No. 2